The 2013 Sioux City Bandits season was the team's fourteenth overall, thirteenth as the Sioux City Bandits and first as a member of the Champions Professional Indoor Football League (CPIFL). One of ten teams in the CPIFL for the inaugural 2013 season, the Bandits finished the regular season with a 10-2 record to earn the number one seed in the playoffs, in which they lost on a missed last-second field goal to the Salina Bombers, 29-28 in the semifinals.

Schedule
Key:

Regular season

Post-season

Roster

References

Sioux City Bandits
Sioux City 2013
Sioux City Bandits